Streptomyces thermospinosisporus is a bacterium species from the genus of Streptomyces which has been isolated from garden soil in the United Kingdom.

See also 
 List of Streptomyces species

References

Further reading

External links
Type strain of Streptomyces thermospinosisporus at BacDive -  the Bacterial Diversity Metadatabase	

thermospinosisporus
Bacteria described in 2002